Tenzin Choegyal is a musician from Tibet.

Biography 
As a child, he listened to his mother's songs in the style of Tibetan nomads, and he attributes much of his passion to his mother.  

In 1997, he moved to Australia where he made his debut in the world of Australian music. Choegyal has worked with many prominent musicians, including Philip Glass, Laurie Anderson, Michael Askill, Matt Hsu's Obscure Orchestra, Shen Flindell, Spiros Rantos, Ash Grunwald, Paul Coppen, Stringmansassy, Oscar and Marigold, Riley Lee, James Coats, Tsering Dorjee Bawa, Baatar Sukh, Katherine Philp, Cathedral Band, and Marcello Milani, to name a few. 

He has also performed with Tibetan monks in exile, whom he supports financially through his tours, as well as the Tibetan Children's Villages, the school for Tibetan refugee children which he attended as a child.

Awards

Queensland Music Awards
The Queensland Music Awards (previously known as Q Song Awards) are annual awards celebrating Queensland, Australia's brightest emerging artists and established legends. They commenced in 2006.

 (wins only)
|-
| 2008
| "Crane Song"
| World / Folk Song of the Year 
| 
|-

References

External links 

Tenzin Choegyal, World Musician and Festival Organizer, VOA, 15 April 2015
Phil Brown, "Tenzin Choegyal in Japan", The Courier-Mail, Brisbane, 11 May 2016

Year of birth missing (living people)
Chinese male composers
21st-century Tibetan male singers
Living people
People from Ngari Prefecture